Senator Whitman may refer to:

Alexander B. Whitman (1854–1910), Wisconsin State Senate
Joel Whitman (1823–1905), Wisconsin State Senate
Platt Whitman (1871–1935), Wisconsin State Senate